ARKONA (ACCS) – is an Air Command and Control System (ACCS) of the German Air Force.

Definition 
According to NATO terminology, ARKONA was an Air Situation Awareness / Recognized Air Picture (RAP) System of the former National People's Army (NVA) operated by the Air Forces of the National People's Army. After the German reunification in 1990, it was adapted to NATO standards, developed to an ACCS, and integrated to the Bundeswehr / German Air Force.

Original NVA designation:

History
The procurement product ARKONA was developed, introduced and operated by order of the Air Forces of the National People's Army Command. The overall responsibility was with the ACOS and Chief Command Posts and Automation (de: Gefechtstände Automatisierung - GSA) Major General Dr. G. Hiemann. It was dedicated exclusively to the East German Air Force (East GAF) and operated on Air Command and Control (ACC) Post level, according to NATO terminology Control and Reporting Centre (CRC) / Control and Reporting Post (CRP). The system design, software development, – maintenance, and – change was mainly provided by east German soldiers / IT-engineers with education background of the Soviet Union's Military Academy, S.M. Budjonny in St. Petersburg. According to its own understanding, with the final software release the NVA was equipped with a co-primary ACCS which was independent from the Russian system ALMAS at that time. As to Confidence and Availability ARKONA did have advantages in comparison to ALMAS.

Remark: 
Original designation (ru Soviet Army): Алмаз — АСУ КП объединений и ЦКП Войск ПВО
Translation (en): Automated Control System Division Command Post and Major Operating Centre Air Defence

ARKONA advantages
In spite of some compatibility problems to the Integrated NATO Air Defense System (ARKONA did not have full backup capability as to weapons control and operations), the basic ideas have been worth to be preserved. The general positive assessment of the ARKONA IT-Architecture initiated the final decision to transfer ARKONA to the Bundeswehr.

Take-over and utilisation in the Bundeswehr
After ARKONA was taken over by the Bundeswehr, the rework of the system documentation (including the IT-Security Concept) had to be provided as this is the case with any regular German procurement product. Subsequently, that particular product had to be upgraded to a full compatible and interoperable NATO ACCS. Since that time it has been embedded into the organisational structure of the German Air Force. In the time to come, the operational utilisation of ARKONA took place mainly in stationary CRC, in deployable engagements, and by so-called third party users with the agreement of the responsible in-service support manager.

Functionality today 
ARKONA is a self-supporting System with interfaces to other IT-Architectures. System internal it receives TDL information (e.g. Link 1) and generates distributes and displays system internal a RAP. During missions on any working position different systems of co-ordinates are displayable and on-the-fly changeable. Bull's–eye Control  is possible and Vector Assistance is available. Moreover, from different sensors with different data formats ARKONA is capable to receive, process, and display . The appropriate CRC operational scenario as well different missions exercise and training might be provided on the basis of the explicit working position mode. In any case the hardware can be maintained. Up to 2005 the processing of correlated Flight plan date was supported by ADMAR 2000 and in the time to come by CIMACT.

Features 
 Compatibility to The NATO Data link standards Link 1 and interoperability to the NASTO Airde Defence
 Maximal upper limit of targets to be processed = 3,000 Flight targets (Tracks)
 Direct connection of up to 255 sensors
 Sensor data reception via the military RADAR Data Network (MilRADNET) and the RDNAT of the Deutsche Flugsicherung (DFS)
 Conversion of any proprietary RADAR data format to the ASTERIX data standard
 Link 1 data exchange wit up to 16 Air Defence Control Centres
 Data communication via Interim JTIDS Message Specification/Standard with AWACS
 LAN data communication via TCT/IP and UDP/IPLAN

Remark:
ARKONA processes the ASTERIX categories CAT001, 002, 034 and 048, available via the civil DFS RADNAR.

Hardware Software 
ARKONA runes on COTS hardware which has to meet specific technical requirements. With the exemption of a small number of particular cases X86-Class  PCs are recommended. The data providing IT might be on COTS as well. The operating system is Microsoft. Software engineering, - maintenance, and - change is executed by the GAF C3 Systems Support Centre (GAF C3 SSC) in Erndtebrück. The previous advantages (based on MS Windows and COTS hardware) changed end of the 1990th more and more into the oboist. Windows became permanently more complex, the hardware configuration had to be changed more frequently, and last but not least the latent IT-security risks became unacceptable. In order to overcome these problems the German Improved Air Defence System (GIADS) was procured and introduced in 2004.

In-Service Support Management 
The General Air Force Office (de: Luftwaffenamt - LWA), later the GAF Material Command and finally the GAF Weapon Systems Command – WSC (de: Waffensystemkommando der Luftwaffe – WaSysKdoLw) have been in charge of the ARKONA In-Service Support Management (ISSM) since its take-over to the Bundeswehr in 1990. Today this WSC provides the obsolescence management, the hardware and software configuration control and the software related instructions to the GAF C3 SSC. The in-service support manager certifies on request the utilisation of third party users.

End of lifecycle utilisation 
With the closure of the last ARKONA CRC – Brockzetel in December 2010 the stationary utilisation of this ACC System was frozen. For special cases, e.g. Deployable Air Situation Display and Interface Processor System (DASDIPS), and as far as the logistic maintenance remains possible, ARKONA might be used continuously. This will be the case for third party users as well. Moreover, there might be requirement for selected features e.g.:

 Interface functionality / data exchange of tactical data links
 Utilisation of the ARKONA IT-Security gateway function high-to-low  (certified by the National Certification Authority) in line with the Security Operating Procedures (SOP)
 ASTERIX conversion of proprietary RADRA data formats
 Mode S processing / display

Remark:
The DASDIPS pool consists mainly of deployable hardware and software products operated by the GAF Tactical Command and Control Service (TACCS / de: Einsatzführungsdienst der Luftwaffe – EinsFüDstLw). Some of these component are the ARKONA ACC System, the remaining terrestrial radio systems of the Aeronautical Mobile Service (R-863, AMS East, original description "Бекас P-863M") and the CSI (CRC/SAM Interface) System. DASDIPS is mainly dedicated to support limited operations (e.g. to provide assistance to the Federal Police, exercises, etc.) with the emphasis RAP display, interface functionality, and the improvement of the Air Situation Awareness.

At present the successor product GIADS is operational in the stationary CRCs and in the Deployable CRC.

References 
 G. Hiemann, Lehrbuch Mil. FS, ... 1987, 
 Sowj. Truppen in D, ... 1994, 
 50 Jahre Einsatzführungsdienst der Luftwaffe 1969–2010, issued by L. Fölbach

External links 
  
 Fölbach Medienservice 

Air Forces of the National People's Army
Cold War military equipment of Germany
Information operations and warfare
German Air Force
NATO
Command and control